Conway chained arrow notation, created by mathematician John Horton Conway, is a means of expressing certain extremely large numbers. It is simply a finite sequence of positive integers separated by rightward arrows, e.g. .

As with most combinatorial notations, the definition is recursive. In this case the notation eventually resolves to being the leftmost number raised to some (usually enormous) integer power.

Definition and overview
A "Conway chain" is defined as follows:
 Any positive integer is a chain of length .
 A chain of length n, followed by a right-arrow → and a positive integer, together form a chain of length .

Any chain represents an integer, according to the six rules below. Two chains are said to be equivalent if they represent the same integer.

Let  denote positive integers and let  denote the unchanged remainder of the chain. Then:
An empty chain (or a chain of length 0) is equal to 
The chain  represents the number .
The chain  represents the number .
The chain   represents the same number as the chain 
The chain  represents the same number as the chain 
Else, the chain  represents the same number as the chain .

Properties

 A chain evaluates to a perfect power of its first number
Therefore,  is equal to 
  is equivalent to 
  is equal to 

Interpretation
One must be careful to treat an arrow chain as a whole. Arrow chains do not describe the iterated application of a binary operator. Whereas chains of other infixed symbols (e.g. 3 + 4 + 5 + 6 + 7) can often be considered in fragments (e.g. (3 + 4) + 5 + (6 + 7)) without a change of meaning (see associativity), or at least can be evaluated step by step in a prescribed order, e.g. 34567 from right to left, that is not so with Conway's arrow chains.

For example:
 
 
 

The sixth definition rule is the core: A chain of 4 or more elements ending with 2 or higher becomes a chain of the same length with a (usually vastly) increased penultimate element. But its ultimate element is decremented, eventually permitting the fifth rule to shorten the chain. After, to paraphrase Knuth, "much detail", the chain is reduced to three elements and the fourth rule terminates the recursion.

Examples
Examples get quite complicated quickly. Here are some small examples:

 (By rule 2)

 (By rule 3)
Thus, 

 (By rule 4)

 

 (By rule 4)
 (see Knuth's up arrow notation)

 (By rule 4)

 (see tetration)

  (By rule 6)
  (By rule 3)
 (By rule 5)
 (By rule 6)
 (By rule 6)
 (By rule 4)

= much larger than previous number

 (By rule 6)
 (By rule 3)
 (By rule 5)
 (By rule 6)
 (By rule 4)
= much, much larger than previous number

Systematic examples
The simplest cases with four terms (containing no integers less than 2) are:
 
 (equivalent to the last-mentioned property)
 
 

We can see a pattern here. If, for any chain , we let  then  (see functional powers).

Thus, for example, .

Moving on:
 

Again we can generalize. When we write  we have , that is, .

Ackermann function
The Ackermann function may be expressed using Conway chained arrow notation:

hence

 for 

Graham's number
Graham's number  itself cannot be expressed concisely in Conway chained arrow notation, but it is bounded by the following:

(The superscript 64 denotes a functional power.)

By applying rule 2 and rule 4 backwards, we simplify:

 (with 64 's)

 (with 64 's)

 (with 64 's)
 (with 65 's)
 (computing as above).
 

Since f is strictly increasing,

which is the given inequality.

CG function 
Conway and Guy created a simple, single-argument function that diagonalizes over the entire notation, defined as:

meaning the sequence is:

...

This function, as one might expect, grows extraordinarily fast.

Extension by Peter Hurford 
Peter Hurford, a web developer and statistician, has defined an extension to this notation:

All normal rules are unchanged otherwise.

 is already equal to the aforementioned , and the function  is much faster growing than Conway and Guy's .

However, if we modify this slightly such that:

then not only does  become legal, but the notation as a whole becomes much stronger.

See also
 Steinhaus–Moser notation
 Systematically creating ever faster increasing sequences

References

External links
 Factoids > big numbers
 Robert Munafo's Large Numbers
The Book of Numbers by J. H. Conway and R. K. Guy

Mathematical notation
Large numbers
John Horton Conway